Colombo International School (CIS) is a private co-educational school in Colombo, Sri Lanka. It was founded in 1982 by Elizabeth Moir and employs an English-medium curriculum.

In 1998 the school was expanded by the new Chairman of the Board of Directors, Armyne Wirasinha, who created a new branch, Colombo International School Kandy, in Mawilmada.

The school provides a British curriculum-based education system which includes the IGCSE Examination for grades 10 and 11 and International Advanced Level for 6th form.

History

Establishment 

Colombo International School was established in 1982, shortly after Elizabeth Moir arrived in Sri Lanka.

The school did not initially have a campus but instead operated out of various repurposed residential buildings and homes. Students were trained according to and to sit for the London Ordinary and Advanced Level examinations, before later transitioning to the Pearson Edexcel qualification.

The school is officially registered as a company under the Companies Act of 1982, making its full registered name Colombo International School (Private) Ltd. It is, therefore, like other international schools, not subject to many of the regulations imposed by the Ministry of Education, being instead subject to the authority of the Board of Investments.

Expansion 

In 1993, the new chairman, Armyne Weerasinghe, initiated a development and expansion programme. In 1998, a new branch, CIS Kandy, was opened. 

The school has since expanded to reach the present enrollment of approximately 1600 students from over 30 countries.

Campus and facilities 

The school is split into two branches. The main branch, situated on Gregory's Road, Colombo 7, admits approximately 1600 students per year, with an average of thirty students per class. The Kandy branch is located off Aluthgantota Road, Mawilmada, and admits approximately half that of the main branch: 700 students per year.

Main branch 

The main branch campus lies next to the Sri Sambodhi Maha Viharaya and is split in two by the Ven. Panadure Ariyadhamma Himi Mawatha, which connects the east-facing Gregory's Road to the south-east bound Wijerama Mawatha.

The main campus is split into three sections:
 Infant section
 A three-storey building that houses the nursery, playgroup, pre-reception and reception classrooms, as well as those for the first and second grades. The third storey contains a dance room and small supplementary classrooms and three computer laboratories reserved for use by the senior school, this is also where the IT department resides.
 Junior section
 A five-storey building with classrooms for the third through sixth grades. It also contains its own separate computer laboratory suitable for twenty students, an art room filled with tables covered in paint and other art provided by the young minds at the junior section and a junior library.
 Senior section
 A collection of buildings containing general-purpose classrooms as well as specialised labs for the sciences, namely the Physics lab, ISL Lab, BIO Lab, an art room, along with the head of the section's office. The main senior building overlooks a cement made playground that is used by the school for various events. With access to the MCA grounds that provide the school with a ground to host inter-house competitions basketball practice and cricket.
 Auditorium complex
 An appendage of the school's main campus, separated from it by the Ven. Panadure Ariyadhamma Himi Mawatha, containing one main swimming pool and a smaller indoor pool, a few examination halls that when reconfigured can become supplementary classrooms and an auditorium for assemblies, staged productions and other functions.

Kandy branch 

The Kandy branch is situated next to the Paranagantota Road.

The campus houses facilities for sports such as netball, basketball and cricket, as well as those for the performing arts and yearly staged productions.

Notable events and controversies

Murder of Yvonne Jonsson 

During the early hours of July 1, 2005, Yvonne Jonsson was murdered by fellow CIS alumnus Jude Shramantha Jayamaha in the stairwell of the Royal Park Condominium.

Various news publications and the younger sister of the deceased alleged that Jayamaha had a history of illicit behaviour during his years at Colombo International School. This included receiving a suspension for the possession of narcotics on school grounds, as well as possibly impregnating another female student.

Sexual education textbook controversy 

In 2010, UNP Member of Parliament and lawyer Dinesh Dodangoda lodged a complaint with the National Child Protection Authority against the use of the textbook, Introducing Moral Issues by Joe Jenkins, in the school's sixth and fifth-grade curriculum.

Dodangoda's complaint was followed by a probe against the school headed by the then chairwoman of the NCPA, Anoma Dissanayake. The complaint focused on the chapters concerning sexual education, namely the ones concerning contraceptives and sexual intercourse.

The school initially refused to remove the book, with then principal M. J. Chappel justifying its use by stating that it had been in the syllabus since 1997 without complaint. The school consultant, D. C. Sanders, further went on to defend its use by stating that the contents of the book were not at all controversial by modern standards and were important to a relevant secondary education.

Failing to bar the use of the book in the school's curriculum, Dodangoda went on to pursue legal action against the school, pursuant to which the Ministry of Education and the NCPA both performed their own investigations into the school.

Rainbow flag controversy 

On September 19, 2018, according to a letter written by then-Acting Principal Sarah Philipps, Saakya Rajawasan, a student at CIS, attended a rehearsal for the senior fashion show wearing a rainbow flag in support of the LGBT community, after previously having been told that the flag would not be tolerated. She was then subsequently barred from participation.

On September 20, Rajaswaan attended school with the flag-draped over her school bag. She refused to remove the flag after being confronted by the school's disciplinary officials. As a result, Rajaswaan received detention and was subject to other disciplinary action due to her actions, which were deemed 'unacceptable and irresponsible behaviour' by the acting principal.

The events that transpired were reported on with special interest by the Colombo Telegraph, an online news publication that went on to release a series of articles in support of Rajawasan.

On October 8, Saakya Rajawasan issued a public statement through bakamoono.lk in which she further went on to allege that she was denied an opportunity for prefectship for which she was otherwise sufficiently qualified, on the grounds that she chose to wear trousers instead of a skirt, which went against the school's uniform for girls.

Notable alumni 

Yanushi Dullewe Wijeyeratne, Cardiology Specialty Registrar with PhD at the St George's University Hospitals NHS Foundation Trust, London, UK & winner of the 2012 Bedi Prize.
 Angajan Ramanathan, Deputy Chairman of Committees of Parliament and Member of Parliament.  
 Anarkalli Aakarsha Jayatilaka, film and teledrama actress, model, member of Southern Provincial Council (2009–present).
 Gajendrakumar Ponnambalam, Member of Parliament - Jaffna (2001-2010)
 Sujit Sivasundaram, Professor of World History, University of Cambridge

References

External links
 Colombo International School Official Website

Colombo Int
Educational institutions established in 1982
Schools in Colombo
1982 establishments in Sri Lanka